Jan Riske (born 1932 in Dordrecht) is a Dutch painter.

Jan Hendrik Riske went to a private Montessori school and was encouraged to draw by his father. Riske was noticed by Laurens J. Bol, director of the Dordrechts Museum. With the financial support from the Ary Scheffer Fund, obtained through the influence of Bol, Riske was able to study at the Art Academy in Rotterdam.

After his studies at the art academy in Rotterdam he emigrated to Australia in 1952.

His work was on exposition at the Museum of Modern Art in Melbourne, the Carnegie International in Pittsburgh and galleries in Amsterdam, New York, Sydney and Melbourne.

These museums have works of Jan Riske on display:
National Gallery of Australia, Canberra
Fine Arts Museum (Dallas)

References

External links
 Jan Riske website
 Interview with Jan Riske from 1992
 Interview with Jan Riske in the Sydney Morning Herald from 2009

1932 births
Living people
Dutch painters
Dutch male painters
Artists from Dordrecht